Thomas or Tom Chandler may refer to:

Politicians
Thomas Alberter Chandler (1871–1953), U.S Representative from Oklahoma
Thomas R. Chandler (born 1954), candidate for Congress from Ohio in the 1990s
Thomas Chandler (New Hampshire politician) (1772–1866), U.S. Representative for New Hampshire
Thomas Chandler Jr. (1740–1798), Vermont colonial leader, founder of Chester, Vermont
Thomas Bradbury Chandler (1726–1790), American priest of the Church of England and author

Characters
Superintendent Tom Chandler (The Bill), a character in the British television drama The Bill
Tom Chandler (The Last Ship), a fictional character in the TV series The Last Ship
Thomas Chandler or Little Chandler, the central character of James Joyce's short story "A Little Cloud"

See also
Thomas Chandler Haliburton (1796–1865), Canadian author
Thomas Chandler Thacher (1858–1945), U.S. politician
Chandler School, founded by Thomas Chandler and Catherine Chandler